The Monongahela Freight Incline was a funicular railway that scaled Mount Washington in Pittsburgh, Pennsylvania, United States.

Designed by Samuel Diescher and John Endres, both immigrants from Europe, the incline was built beside the smaller, original Monongahela Incline. It opened in 1884. The incline cost $125,000 to build.  

It had a unique  broad gauge that would allow vehicles, as well as walk-on passengers, to ascend and descend the hill.  The cars were hoisted by a pair of Robinson & Rea engines.  The incline ran until 1935.  

The older passenger incline, built in 1870, is one of two inclines still serving South Side Pittsburgh today, out of a total of 17 built in the nineteenth century. Passengers can see concrete pylons remaining from the freight incline during the descent.

See also 
 List of funicular railways
 List of inclines in Pittsburgh

References

Sources

A Century of Inclines, The Society for the Preservation of the Duquesne Incline.

Defunct funicular railways in the United States
Railway inclines in Pittsburgh
10 ft gauge railways in the United States
Railway lines opened in 1884
Railway lines closed in 1935
1884 establishments in Pennsylvania
1935 disestablishments in Pennsylvania